Marleasing SA v La Comercial Internacional de Alimentación SA (1990) C-106/89 was a decision of the European Court of Justice concerning the indirect effect of European Community law, now European Union law. It established that the courts of European Union member states have a duty to interpret national legislation in the light of unimplemented European Union directives.

Facts

Marleasing SA (the Applicant) brought an application before the Spanish national courts for an order that the contract establishing "La Comercial" was void and that the formation of La Comercial should be nullified on the grounds that establishment "lacked cause, was a sham transaction and was carried out in order to defraud the creditors of Barviesa (a co-founder of La Comercial)". Spanish law at the time, Articles 1261 and 1275 of the Spanish Civil Code, stated that "contracts without cause or whose cause is unlawful have no legal effect". La Comercial argued that the action should be dismissed in its entirety on the grounds that article 11 of the First Council Directive 68/151/EEC of 9 March 1968 on coordination of safeguards which, for the protection of the interests of members and others, which had not yet been implemented by Spain, provided an exhaustive list of the cases under which the nullity of a company may be ordered and that "lack of cause" was not a ground listed therein. The Spanish court then referred the following question to the European Court of Justice:

"Is Article 11 of [the] Council Directive 68/151/EEC of 9 March 1968, which has not been implemented in national law, directly applicable so as to preclude a declaration of nullity of a public limited liability company on a ground other than those set out in the said article?"

Judgment
The ECJ held that the Spanish Courts were under a duty to interpret national law in a way that gave effect to European law.

See also

 Direct effect

References

External links
 Judgment of the Court of 13 November 1990. Marleasing SA v La Comercial Internacional de Alimentacion SA. Reference for a preliminary ruling: Juzgado de Primera Instancia e Instruccion no 1 de Oviedo - Spain. Directive 68/151/CEE - Article 11 - Consistent interpretation of national law. Case C-106/89

Court of Justice of the European Union case law
1990 in case law
1990 in Spain
Spanish case law